Pedro Lamas Baliero (unknown – unknown) was a Uruguayan chess player, two-time Uruguayan Chess Championship winner (1969, 1972).

Biography
From the end of 1960s to begin 1990s Pedro Lamas Baliero was one of Uruguayan leading chess players. He twice won Uruguayan Chess Championships: 1969, and 1972. In 1972, in Havana Pedro Lamas Baliero participated in 7th Pan American Chess Championship and ranked in 9th place.

Pedro Lamas Baliero played for Uruguay in the Chess Olympiads:
 In 1974, at first board in the 21st Chess Olympiad in Nice (+4, =3, -10),
 In 1978, at first reserve board in the 23rd Chess Olympiad in Buenos Aires (+2, =6, -1),
 In 1988, at second reserve board in the 28th Chess Olympiad in Thessaloniki (+1, =3, -1),
 In 1990, at second reserve board in the 29th Chess Olympiad in Novi Sad (+1, =5, -1).

Pedro Lamas Baliero played for Uruguay in the Pan American Team Chess Championships:
 In 1971, at second board in the 1st Panamerican Team Chess Championship in Tucuman (+0, =2, -4),
 In 1987, at fourth board in the 3rd Panamerican Team Chess Championship in Junín (+2, =3, -3).

Pedro Lamas Baliero played for Uruguay in the South American Team Chess Championship:
 In 1989, at third board in the 1st South American Team Chess Championship in Mar del Plata (+1, =2, -0).

References

External links

Pedro Lamas Baliero chess games at 365chess.com

Year of birth missing
Year of death missing
Uruguayan chess players
Chess Olympiad competitors
20th-century chess players